Serixia apicalis is a species of beetle in the family Cerambycidae. It was described by Francis Polkinghorne Pascoe in 1856. It is known from Borneo and Malaysia.

References

Serixia
Beetles described in 1856